The 1995–96 Luxembourg Cup was the third playing of the Luxembourg Cup ice hockey tournament. Four teams participated in the tournament, which was won by Tornado Luxembourg.

First round

Group 1

Group 2 
 Lokomotive Luxembourg qualified for final.

Final 
 Tornado Luxembourg - Lokomotive Luxembourg 14:7

External links 
 Season on hockeyarchives.info

Luxembourg Cup
Luxembourg Cup (ice hockey) seasons